The SGH-X480 is a mobile phone from Samsung, released in the first quarter of 2005.

The phone focuses on being small and light rather than on advanced features like camera and music.

Connectivity to PC is made through its serial interface, rather than USB.

The phone uses neither an S20 nor an M20 (both Samsung proprietary) connector for data and charging, but Samsung's older 18-pin connector, without a specific name.

The phone comes with four built-in Java games: BubbleSmile, Fun2Link, Ultimate Golf Challenge, and MobileChess.

References 

 http://www.gsmarena.com/samsung_x480-1022.php

X480
Mobile phones introduced in 2005